Arnaldo de Oliveira da Silva (born 26 March 1964 in Rio de Janeiro) is a former Brazilian athlete who competed mainly in the 100 metres. He is a four-time Olympian (1984, 1988, 1992 and 1996).

He competed for Brazil at the 1996 Summer Olympics held in Atlanta, United States, where he won the bronze medal in the men's 4 x 100 metre relay with his teammates Robson da Silva, Edson Ribeiro and André da Silva.

References

1964 births
Living people
Brazilian male sprinters
Olympic bronze medalists for Brazil
Athletes (track and field) at the 1984 Summer Olympics
Athletes (track and field) at the 1988 Summer Olympics
Athletes (track and field) at the 1992 Summer Olympics
Athletes (track and field) at the 1996 Summer Olympics
Athletes (track and field) at the 1987 Pan American Games
Athletes (track and field) at the 1995 Pan American Games
Olympic athletes of Brazil
Athletes from Rio de Janeiro (city)
Medalists at the 1996 Summer Olympics
Olympic bronze medalists in athletics (track and field)
Pan American Games athletes for Brazil